This is a list of University of Louisiana at Lafayette people, alumni or faculty affiliated with the University of Louisiana at Lafayette, a public research university in Lafayette, Louisiana. To be included in this list the person must demonstrate notability by having an article and the article must state a connect the person to the school.

Alumni

Academia, scholar

Actors, model

Artist and designer

Filmmaker

Journalists

Musicians

Writers, poets

Law, government, and politics

Military

Science and technology

Religious 
Roy Bourgeois, priest; founder of the human rights group SOA Watch (1990-)
Sam Seamans, Bishop, Reformed Episcopal Church

Sports

American football

Baseball

Basketball

Golf
Mike Heinen, former professional golfer
Craig Perks, former professional golfer, 2002 New Zealand Sportsman of the Year

Tennis
Tony Minnis, UL Lafayette's all-time winningest singles player with a 94–40 college career; Louisiana Coach of the Year 1995 and 1999

Track and field
Hollis Conway, high-jump athlete; Olympic medalist, 1988 silver, 1992 bronze
John McDonnell, UL Lafayette track athlete (1966–1969); coached Arkansas to 42 NCAA championships

Other
Alan Jouban (attended), professional mixed martial artist, currently for the UFC's Welterweight Division
H. Micheal Tarver, Latin American historian; Commissioner on the Arkansas History Commission and the Arkansas Historical Records Advisory Board.

Faculty
Barry Jean Ancelet (born 1951), ULL faculty since 1977; ULL alumni, graduated in 1974; folklorist of Cajun culture and expert of Cajun music and language.
Carl L. Bankston (born 1952), former professor; sociologist, author, immigration expert.
Carl W. Bauer (1933–2013), lawyer, politician and businessman; chief ULL lobbyist 1990–2010; member of both houses of the Louisiana State Legislature from St. Mary Parish 1966–1976.
Carl A. Brasseaux (born 1951), historian that helped pioneer the field of Cajun history; University of Louisiana at Lafayette professor and director of the Center for Louisiana Studies and the Center for Eco-Tourism, also an alumni.
Henry C. Dethloff (born 1934), American historian; instructor, assistant professor, and associate professor from 1962 to 1968.
Michael Doucet (born in 1951), Cajun fiddler; winner National Heritage Fellowship; designed and taught the first college course on Cajun music.
Jeff Hennessy (1929–2015), associate professor of Physical Education from 1959 to 1986; former trampoline coach to world champions.
Elemore Morgan, Jr. (1931–2008), associate professor from 1965 to 1998; landscape painter
Paul Prudhomme (1940–2015), chef famous for his Cajun cuisine; former adjunct
Burton Raffel (1928–2015), former professor and Chair in Humanities department from 1989 until 2015 and professor emeritus of English starting in 2003; poet, noted for his translation of Cervantes's Don Quixote
John Kennedy Toole (1937–1969), former professor in 1959; novelist, author of A Confederacy of Dunces

Artists in residency 

Ernest Gaines (1939–2019), writer-in-residence; nominated for the 2004 Nobel Prize in Literature and the 1993 Pulitzer Prize for fiction; author of The Autobiography of Miss Jane Pittman and A Lesson Before Dying
Jesse Glass (born 1954), former resident poet

See also 

 List of University of Louisiana at Lafayette presidents

References

External links
MLB Amateur Draft Picks who came from "University of Louisiana at Lafayette (Lafayette, LA)" at Baseball-Reference.com

University of Louisiana at Lafayette people
University of Louisiana at Lafayette people